Seif Daoud (born 28 August 1977) is a former Egyptian footballer.

Career
Daoud played for Al-Masry Club in the Egyptian Premier League between 1995 and 2003. He was recently appointed as the assistant coach of the team.

Clubs
Al-Masry Club (1995-03)
MKE Ankaragücü (2003–04)

National teams
He played once for the Egyptian national team.

Titles
Personal
 The all-time top goal scorer for Al-Masry in African Clubs Cups.
 He scored the fastest goal in Egypt Cup History vs. Arab Contractors SC, 1998, after 21 seconds of play.

For Al-Masry
 1 title of Egypt Cup 1998

References

 

1977 births
Living people
Al Masry SC players
Egyptian footballers
Egypt international footballers
Sportspeople from Port Said
Association football forwards